Rajnagar is a town and nagar panchayat in Chhatarpur district in the Indian state of Madhya Pradesh, it is 6 km from Khajuraho, 5 km from Khajwa town and 35 km from district headquarters, Chhatarpur.

Geography
It has an average elevation of 273 metres (895 feet).

Demographics
At the 2001 census, Rajnagar had a population of 12,442. Males constituted 53% of the population, and females 47%. In Rajnagar, 18% of the population is under 6 years of age.

In Census 2011, total population stood at 14,253.

Literacy rate of Rajnagar town was found to be 73.71%, higher than the state average of 69.32%. In Rajnagar, male literacy rate was around 79.93% while female literacy rate was 66.60% in 2011.

Nearest town and cities 
Chhatarpur, Khajuraho, khajwa, Panna, Mahoba, Nowgong are the nearby town and cities to Rajnagar.

Schools 
Government school Rajnagar.
Little Angel's Model High school rajnagar.
Sarswati Sishu Mandir

Hospital 
Rajnagar government Hospital.

Transport

Bus stop and bus stand 
 Rajnagar bus stand. 
 Khajuraho bus stand.
 Khajwa chauraha bus stop.

Train 
 Rajnagar railway station.
 Khajuraho railway station.

Airport 
 Khajuraho airport.

References

Bundelkhand
Chhatarpur
Cities and towns in Chhatarpur district